Henry Mackay Brown (14 June 1910 – 1 June 1965) was a New Zealand rugby union player. A wing, Brown represented King Country, Auckland, and Poverty Bay at a provincial level. He was a member of the New Zealand national side, the All Blacks, on their 1935–36 tour of Britain, Ireland and Canada. He played in eight matches on that tour, scoring five tries, but did not appear in any internationals.

References

1910 births
1965 deaths
Rugby union players from New Plymouth
People educated at New Plymouth Boys' High School
New Zealand rugby union players
New Zealand international rugby union players
King Country rugby union players
Auckland rugby union players
Poverty Bay rugby union players
Rugby union wings